Trichoptilus potentellus is a moth of the family Pterophoridae. It is found in North America, including California.

Taxonomy
Trichoptilus potentellus is sometimes listed as a synonym of Trichoptilus pygmaeus.

References

Moths described in 1940
Oxyptilini
Moths of North America